Pierre Vincent may refer to:

 Pierre Vincent (athlete) (born 1992), French sprinter in 2014 European Athletics Championships etc.
 Pierre Vincent (basketball) (born 1964), French basketball coach
 Pierre L. J. Vincent, Canadian republican activist
 Pierre H. Vincent, Canadian Member of Parliament for Trois-Rivières, Québec, 1984–1993

See also
 Pierre-Vincent Valin (1827–1897), Canadian businessman and political figure from Quebec